The 1989 European Wrestling Championships were held in the men's Freestyle style in Ankara 12 – 14 May 1989; the Greco-Romane style in Oulu 5 – 7 May 1989.

Medal table

Medal summary

Men's freestyle

Men's Greco-Roman

References

External links
Fila's official championship website

Europe
W
W
European Wrestling Championships
Euro
Euro
Sports competitions in Ankara
1989 in European sport